Tamenglong district (Meitei pronunciation:/tæmɛŋˈlɒŋ/) is one of the 16 districts of Manipur state in northeastern India.

History
In 1919, the British Government established four sub-divisions office in Manipur Hills known as North East Sub-Division, North West Sub-Division, South East Sub-Division and South West Sub-Division. The Headquarters of North West Sub-Division was set up at Khunjao, Tamenglong Village (Nriangluang) and Mr. William Shaw was appointed as the Sub-Divisional Officer. In 1923, the headquarters of Northwest sub-division was shifted to the present site known as Tamenglong headquarters some 3 km away from Khunjao. Later the Manipur North West sub-division was renamed as Tamenglong Sub-Division. Tamenglong became a full-fledged district in 1969 and the first Deputy Commissioner was posted.

Geography
This district is bounded by Nagaland state on the north, by Senapati district on the north and east, by Churchandpur district on the south and by Imphal West district and Assam state on the west.  Tamenglong town is the headquarters of this district. The district occupies an area of 4391 km.

The District contains virgin forests, exotic orchids, rare and endangered plants, and wildlife. The forests contain tropical evergreen forests, subtropical forests and bamboo brakes. The dense tropical evergreen forests are located along the riversides across the district. Wildflowers include several types of orchids, including epiphytic, lithophytic and terrestrial.

Places of interest 
Tamenglong district of Manipur has a topography of irregular undulation with turbulent rivers, waterfalls, caves, lakes, and dense tropical forests covering the land.

Along the river Barak there is a series of seven waterfalls.
The Tharon cave (Chalem-Ky) is located at about 27 km from the district HQ. The map of the entire cave is engraved and painted on a stone at the main entrance. Archeological excavation of the cave shows connections to the Hoabinhian culture of North Vietnam.
Zeilad lake at Makoi (Atengba) is associated with a number of pythons, fishes, and water birds. There are several other lakes nearby including Guiphop Zei, Nrou Zei, and Nap-sam Zei.
Buning Meadow (Npiulong) is located on the western side of Tamei town. A number of well-groomed uneven small mounds as well numerous brooks mark the stretch. In early summer ground orchids and Wild Lilies can be seen in the meadow. The meadow is also home to wild birds and foxes.
Phelong Village is well known for its Orange production and its taste. Phelong has been one of the major producers of oranges in Tamenglong District.
Taningjam Village is one of the oldest villages of Tamenglong District. The rivers and Rock Garden are well-known attractions for a visit to the village.

Economy
In 2006 the Ministry of Panchayati Raj named Tamenglong one of the country's 250 most backward districts (out of a total of 640). It is one of the three districts in Manipur currently receiving funds from the Backward Regions Grant Fund Programme (BRGF).

Administrative divisions 

The district is divided into three sub-divisions:
 Tamenglong
 Tamei
 Tousem

In December 2016, Noney District was carved out from Tamenglong district; comprising sub-divisions of Longmei (Noney), Nungba, Khoupum, and Haochong.

Demographics
According to the 2011 census Tamenglong district has a population of 140,651, roughly equal to the nation of Saint Lucia. This gives it a ranking of 607th in India (out of a total of 640). Its population growth rate over the decade 2001–2011 was 25.69%. Tamenglong has a sex ratio of 953 females for every 1000 males, and a literacy rate of 70.4%.

Gallery

Notable Personalities 
Armstrong Pame

See also 
 List of populated places in Tamenglong district

Notes

References

External links
Official website of Tamenglong district

 
Districts of Manipur
Minority Concentrated Districts in India
1969 establishments in Manipur